EAS (Executive Airlines Services) Airlines was an airline based in Lagos, Nigeria. Its main base was Murtala Mohammed International Airport, Lagos.

In July 2006, the airline merged with Fleet Air Nigeria Limited, forming the short-lived Nicon Airways.

Code data
ICAO Code: EXW 
Callsign: ECHOLINE

History
The airline was established on 23 December 1983.

Destinations

EAS Airlines operated services to the following domestic scheduled destinations (at January 2005): Abuja, Enugu, Jos, Lagos and Port Harcourt.

Fleet

The EAS Airlines fleet consisted of the following aircraft:

4BAC 1-11-500
4Boeing 707-351C
2Boeing 737-200
1Douglas DC-8-55F

Accidents and incidents

On 4 May 2002, a BAC 111-500 plane crashed into a densely populated neighborhood shortly after take-off from Kano. At least 103 people were killed, many of whom were on the ground.

References

External links

EAS Airlines

Defunct airlines of Nigeria
Airlines established in 1983
Airlines disestablished in 2006
Defunct companies based in Lagos
2006 disestablishments in Nigeria
Nigerian companies established in 1983